Trond Jensrud (born 2 September 1968 in Ringerike) is a Norwegian politician for the Labour Party.

He was elected to the Norwegian Parliament from Buskerud in 1989, but was not re-elected in 1993.

He was also a member of Buskerud county council in 1995–1996.

References

1968 births
Living people
Labour Party (Norway) politicians
Members of the Storting
People from Ringerike (municipality)
20th-century Norwegian politicians